Velchanos is an ancient Minoan god associated with vegetation and worshipped in Crete. He was one of the main deities in the Minoan pantheon, alongside a Mother Goddess figure who appears to have been his mother and consort, with the two participating in an hieros gamos.

The cult of Velchanos was likely influenced by the Mesopotamian deitiy Dumuzid. Following the rise of Mycenaean Greece and contact with the Minoans,  Velchanos' cult influenced that of Zeus, who was at times referred to by Greeks under the name Zeus Velchanos. Other possible influences include the Roman deity Vulcan.

Origins
According to Arthur Evans, a tree cult played one of the most important aspects of the Minoan religion in ancient Crete. In this cult, two deities were worshipped; one male and one female. In this tree cult, while the Mother Goddess was viewed as a personification of tree-vegetation, the male god formed a "concrete image of the vegetation itself in the shape of a divine child or a youth", with the two forming a mother and child relationship. Given the role of the hieros gamos between the two, it has been theorized that Velchanos was partially based on the Mesopotamian Dumuzid.

Worship

Mycenaean period
The Minoans viewed Velchanos as less powerful than the goddess.

At some point, the Mycenaean civilization came in contact with the Minoans, who identified their own god Zeus with the Cretan god. This religious syncretism led to Zeus obtaining some of Velchanos' traits, with his mythology also being affected; henceforth, Zeus was stated to have been born in Crete and was often represented as a beardless youth. He was also venerated as Zeus Velchanos.

Hellenistic period
In the 4th century BC, during the beginning of the Hellenistic era, Hagia Triada fell under the control of the polis of Phaistos and was reinstated as a place of worship. In this period, an aedicula was installed over a Minoan stoa in honor of Zeus Velchanos. In the same location, a bull protome was also found, built around the 2nd century BC, which is attributed to the shrine of Velchanos. Velchanos appears to have been worshipped in Gortyna as well, as coins depicting him have been found.

Velchanus' main festival, the Velchania, was likely celebrated in the Cretan poleis of Gortyna, Lyttos, and Knossos.

Iconography

Symbols
Coins from Phaistos depicted Zeus Velchanos with a cock in his lap. These coins also depicted him with an oak tree. He was also depicted with a bull. At other times, Velchanos was depicted as an eagle.

Influences on other cultures
Given the similarities in naming, it has been suggested that Velchanos was an influence on Vulcan from Roman mythology.

References

Bibliography

 
 
 
 
 
 
 
 
 
 
 
 

Chthonic beings
Greek mythology
Minoan religion
Minoan art
Nature gods
Zeus
Vulcan (mythology)